NOW Leicester is a local commercial digital radio multiplex in the United Kingdom, which serves Leicestershire and Rutland. It commenced broadcasts on 6 December 2002 and is operated by NOW Digital on behalf of NOW Digital East Midlands Ltd, a consortium of Arqiva, Global Radio and Sabras Radio. The launch was delayed by the UK firemen's strike in autumn 2002, which restricted access to transmitter sites.

Original plans
NOW Digital originally proposed to use transmitters at Copt Oak and Waltham with Skeffington to follow within two years of launch. However, on awarding the application the Radio Authority identified that coverage in Leicester itself may not be as good as listeners would expect, and accordingly asked Now Digital to "re-examine its transmission plans in order to address this concern", resulting in the adoption of Houghton on the Hill instead of Waltham. In their original application NOW Digital also identified two additional transmitter sites at Boundary water tower and Empingham, and their introduction would be reviewed during the licence period. Both transmitters carrying the NOW Leicester ensemble also carry the national commercial ensemble Digital One, but not BBC National DAB

Stations carried

The following channels are receivable on any digital-equipped DAB radio in the Leicestershire area:

Neither of Lincs FM group's two stations in the area are on the multiplex.

Former services
Services previously carried on the multiplex include:

Original proposals
Now Digital and EMAP competed for the licence, the services proposed by both applicants were as follows:-

NOW Digital
105.4 Leicester Sound
Sabras Sound
106 Century FM
The second East Midlands regional station from launch - awarded to Saga 106.6FM (now Smooth Radio)
The Arrow - rock music
tba - pop hits
Cube - children's music, launched as Capital Disney
Asian Plus - Asian youth

EMAP
 105.4 Leicester Sound
 Sabras Sound
 106 Century FM (Now Heart 106)
 The second East Midlands regional station from launch - awarded to Saga 106.6FM (now Smooth Radio)
 107 Oak FM - Local radio station for Loughborough
 TAP - Asian youth
 tba - Oldies
 XFM - Indie, Alternative Rock
 KISS - Dance
 tba - Jazz and Soul

Additionally EMAP proposed that the following services would be broadcast on a part-time basis:

 103.2 Takeover Radio - Children's radio, Saturdays 07:00-14:00
 Leicester Sports Radio - Local sport, Weekend afternoons.
 Demon FM - Leicester student radio, Saturdays 18:00-24:00

See also
 Waltham transmitting station - carries NOW Nottingham

References

External links
 Copt Oak transmitter
 Houghton on the Hill transmitter
 Coverage map
 Award of licence in February 2002
 Application for the licence

Digital audio broadcasting multiplexes
Radio stations in Leicestershire
2002 establishments in England
Radio stations in England